UB4 may refer to

 UB4, a postcode district in the UB postcode area
 SM UB-4, a World War I German submarine